The South Division of the 2009 Twenty20 Cup determined which counties would qualify for the knockout stage of the 2009 Twenty20 Cup. Kent and Sussex qualified automatically, while Hampshire qualified as the second-best of the third-placed finishers.

Table

Matches

25 May

26 May

27 May

28 May

29 May

31 May

1 June

2 June

3 June

4 June

22 June

23 June

24 June

25 June

26 June

27 June

28 June

References

Twenty20 Cup South Division